The Journal of Consumer Research is a bimonthly peer-reviewed academic journal covering research on the psychological aspects of consumer behavior. It was established in 1974 and originally published by University of Chicago Press. Since 2015 it has been published by Oxford University Press. According to the Journal Citation Reports, the journal has a 2016 impact factor of 3.800, ranking it 19th out of 121 journals in the category "Business."

References 

Oxford University Press academic journals
Economics journals
Bimonthly journals
English-language journals
Publications established in 1974